The Indiana–Ohio League was a class D level baseball league that operated briefly in 1908. The league was started on May 9, 1908 with four teams. Three of the teams were based in Indiana, with one in Ohio. National Association status was granted to the league by Minor League Baseball on June 3, 1908.

However, a long series of financial losses by each club in the league caused its disbandment. The Richmond Amusement Company, which owned the Richmond Quakers, reported losses in excess of a thousand dollars. The league permanently folded on June 8, 1908.

Cities represented 
Huntington, IN: Huntington Miamis (1908) 
Van Wert, OH: Van Wert Buckeyes (1908) 
Richmond, IN: Richmond Quakers (1908) 
Muncie, IN: Muncie Fruit Jars (1908)

Standings & statistics

References

Defunct baseball leagues in the United States
Baseball leagues in Ohio
Baseball leagues in Indiana
Sports leagues established in 1908
1908 establishments in the United States
Defunct minor baseball leagues in the United States
Sports leagues disestablished in 1908